Kheyrabad (also Romanized as Kheyrābād) is a village in Shahidabad Rural District, Mashhad-e Morghab District, Khorrambid County, Fars Province, Iran. At the 2006 census, its population was 509, in 105 families.

References 

Populated places in Khorrambid County